Hello Carter is a 2013 British comedy-drama film written and directed by Anthony Wilcox and starring Charlie Cox and Jodie Whittaker. The film is based on Wilcox's 2011 short film of the same name. It is also Wilcox's directorial debut.

Plot
Recently sacked and interminably single, Carter is in a rut. So when he spies his beautiful ex-girlfriend through a library bookshelf, for a brief moment, things promise to get a whole lot better. But she is nine months pregnant. And about to go into labour.

Cast
Charlie Cox as Carter
Jodie Whittaker as Jenny
Paul Schneider as Aaron
Christian Cooke as Eliott
Laura Donnelly as Tara
Henry Lloyd-Hughes as Nicholas Renfrew
Judy Parfitt as Aunt Miriam
Antonia Thomas as Mischa
Annabelle Wallis as Kelly

Reception
On review aggregation website Rotten Tomatoes, the film holds an approval rating of 29% based on 7 reviews, with an average rating of 4/10. Film critics James Luxford of Radio Times, Kathryn Bromwich of Time Out and Catherine Shoard of The Guardian all gave it two stars out of five.

References

External links
 
 

2013 films
British comedy-drama films
Features based on short films
2013 comedy-drama films
2013 directorial debut films
2013 comedy films
2010s English-language films
2010s British films